The 1945 Liège–Bastogne–Liège was the 31st edition of the Liège–Bastogne–Liège cycle race and was held on 5 August 1945. The race started and finished in Liège. The race was won by Jan Engels.

General classification

References

1945
1945 in Belgian sport